Asfij (also Romanized as Āsfīj and Esfīj; also known as Arpīsh, Āsfīch, Az Pīsh, and Esfīch) is a village in Naharjan Rural District, Mud District, Sarbisheh County, South Khorasan Province, Iran. At the 2006 census, its population was 117, in 43 families.

References 

Populated places in Sarbisheh County